Dimemebfe (5-MeO-BFE) is a recreational drug and research chemical.  It acts as an agonist for the 5-HT1A and 5-HT2 family of serotonin receptors. It is related in structure to the psychedelic tryptamine derivative 5-MeO-DMT, but with the indole nitrogen replaced by oxygen, making dimemebfe a benzofuran derivative. It is several times less potent as a serotonin agonist than 5-MeO-DMT and with relatively more activity at 5-HT1A, but still shows strongest effects at the 5-HT2 family of receptors.

Legal status
Dimemebfe is a Schedule I controlled substance in the US state of Alabama.

See also 
 5-MeO-DiBF

References 

Benzofuranethanamines
Designer drugs
Serotonin receptor agonists
Benzofuran ethers at the benzene ring